Julian Claman (1918 – April 24, 1969) was an American actor, war correspondent, press agent, stage manager, TV writer/producer, playwright, and novelist. He is well known for producing the TV series Have Gun – Will Travel (1957).

Career
Claman wrote the novels Aging Boy (1964, cited in 2007 by Oscar-winning screenwriter/Pulitzer-winning author Larry McMurtry as a great lost novel) and The Malediction (1969). His first play A Quiet Place starred Tyrone Power and was directed by Delbert Mann. Claman wrote for the Mister Peepers TV series.

Personal life
Claman was married from 1953 to 1961 to five-time Tony-nominated actress Marian Seldes, who appeared in two episodes of Have Gun – Will Travel (1957), the TV series he produced. Seldes and Claman's daughter Katharine (named after Broadway actress/producer Katharine Cornell) is a writer. Julian Claman died in 1969, age 50.

Claman was previously married to Phyllis Claman.  Their daughter Elizabeth lives in Richmond, Calif. In 2020 Elizabeth Claman self-published her life story When Pigs Fly.

Novels and TV series
 Have Gun – Will Travel (1957), TV series, producer
 Mister Peepers, TV series, writer
 The Malediction (1969), novel, writer
 Studio One (1948), producer
 Jamie (1953), producer

References

External links

 Have Gun – Will Travel (TV series) (producer – 39 episodes)

1918 births
1969 deaths
American male film actors
American male stage actors
American male television actors
American television producers
20th-century American novelists
20th-century American male actors
American male novelists
20th-century American businesspeople
20th-century American male writers